Mamadou Sow (born 5 October 1937) is a Senegalese sports shooter. He competed in the men's 25 metre rapid fire pistol event at the 1984 Summer Olympics.

References

1937 births
Living people
Senegalese male sport shooters
Olympic shooters of Senegal
Shooters at the 1984 Summer Olympics
Place of birth missing (living people)